Alexander Barkunov (born May 13, 1981) is a Russian professional ice hockey player. He was selected by Chicago Blackhawks in the 7th round (151st overall) of the 2000 NHL Entry Draft.

Career statistics

Regular season and playoffs

International

References

External links

1981 births
Living people
Amur Khabarovsk players
Chicago Blackhawks draft picks
Lokomotiv Yaroslavl players
Molot-Prikamye Perm players
Russian ice hockey forwards
Torpedo Nizhny Novgorod players
Sportspeople from Yaroslavl